Firuz Khan Mewati was the first Nawab of Shahabad, Alwar and a Commandant in Mughal Army. He was a close confidant and trusted aide of Mughal Emperor Bahadur Shah I. He belonged to a Khanzada Muslim Rajput family which ruled the region of Mewat. He was a descendant of Raja Nahar Khan (through his son Malik Alaudin Khan), who was a Rajput ruler of Mewat State in 14th century. Due to his loyal service in Mughal Army, he was granted the Jagir of Simbli (later Shahbad) by Emperor Bahadur Shah I in 1710.

In 1710 he led the Mughal counter-offensive against the Sikhs, and defeated the Sikhs at the Battle of Thanesar (1710).

He was killed in  the battle fought in 1712 between Mughal princes Jahandar Shah and Azim-ush-Shan.

References

Alwar
Indian Muslims
Year of birth unknown
People from Alwar
People from Tijara